The Oltcit Club 12 CS is a small pick-up based on the Oltcit Club. It was launched in 1993 with a 1299cc engine and a 5-speed gearbox with ratios that favor power. This model also has thicker rear torsion bars to withstand a greater load.

Engine

References

External links

Cars of Romania
History of Craiova